John Arthur Ferch (born February 6, 1936) is a United States diplomat.

Ferch was born in Ohio in 1936. He grew up in Toledo and graduated from Princeton University in 1958.

A career Foreign Service officer, he served as United States Ambassador to Honduras from 1985 to 1986.

References

1936 births
Living people
Ambassadors of the United States to Honduras
United States Foreign Service personnel
People from Toledo, Ohio
Princeton University alumni